Agnibilékrou Department is a department of Indénié-Djuablin Region in Comoé District, Ivory Coast. In 2021, its population was 216,264 and its seat is the settlement of Agnibilékrou. The sub-prefectures of the department are Agnibilékrou, Akoboissué, Damé, Duffrébo, and Tanguélan.

History
Agnibilékrou Department was created in 1995 as a first-level subdivision via a split-off from Abengourou Department. It was the final department created prior to the 1997 conversion of departments into the second-level subdivisions of Ivory Coast.

In 1997, regions were introduced as new first-level subdivisions of Ivory Coast; as a result, all departments were converted into second-level subdivisions. Agnibilékrou Department was included in Moyen-Comoé Region.

In 2011, districts were introduced as new first-level subdivisions of Ivory Coast. At the same time, regions were reorganised and became second-level subdivisions and all departments were converted into third-level subdivisions. At this time, Agnibilékrou Department became part of Indénié-Djuablin Region in Comoé District.
In 2014, the population of the sub-prefecture of Duffrébo was 42,426.

Villages

Notes

Departments of Indénié-Djuablin
1995 establishments in Ivory Coast
States and territories established in 1995